The Hungary women's national basketball team is the team representing Hungary in international women's basketball competitions, organized and run by the Magyar Kosárlabdázók Országos Szövetsége, the governing body of basketball in the country.

Competition records

Olympic Games
1980: 4th

FIBA World Championship
1957: 5th
1959: 7th
1975: 9th
1986: 8th
1998: 10th

EuroBasket
1950: 2nd
1952: 3rd
1954: 4th
1956: 2nd
1958: 7th
1960: 9th
1962: 7th
1964: 8th
1966: 9th
1968: 10th
1970: 10th
1972: 6th
1974: 4th
1976: 8th
1978: 6th
1980: 7th
1981: 9th
1983: 3rd
1985: 3rd
1987: 3rd
1989: 7th
1991: 3rd
1993: 8th
1995: 12th
1997: 4th
2001: 7th
2007: 10th
2009: 13th
2015: 17th
2017: 12th
2019: 7th
2023: Qualified

Team

Current roster
Roster for the FIBA Women's EuroBasket 2019.

Head coach position
Norbert Szekely – 2010, 2011
Sándor Farkas – 2013–2014
Štefan Svitek – since 2015

See also
Hungary women's national under-19 basketball team
Hungary women's national under-17 basketball team
Hungary women's national 3x3 team

References

External links

Official website
FIBA profile

 
Women's national basketball teams